Echohawk was a Pawnee leader, whose name became a surname. It can also refer to:

People
 Bunky Echo–Hawk, Yakama-Pawnee artist
 John EchoHawk, a Pawnee attorney and founder of the Native American Rights Fund
 Larry Echo Hawk, a Pawnee attorney and former head of the Bureau of Indian Affairs

Other
Echohawk, an historical novel by Lynda Durrant

Native American surnames